Alu (also Romanized as Alū, Allū, and ‘Alū) is a village in Dabuy-ye Jonubi Rural District, Dabudasht District, Amol County, Mazandaran Province, Iran. At the 2006 census, its population was 420, in 99 families.

References 

Populated places in Amol County